Bhiwapur is a town and a tehsil in Umred subdivision of Nagpur district in Nagpur revenue Division in the Berar region in the state of Maharashtra, India. Bhiwapur city had a gram panchayat and 2015 it became a Nagar Panchayat. Mr Lav Parmanand Janbandhu (INC) became the first President of Bhiwapur Nagar Panchayat and Mr Shankar Rajeram Dadmal (Shivsena ) becames first Vice President of Bhiwapur Nagar Panchayat and one of the Corporator Mr Balaji Shankar Dewalkar was winning Election by one side voting. He won the election by lot of difference. 

Bhiwapur is famous for red chillies, and red chilli power Mr Vithu Laxman Dahare Ganga Vithu Dahare is proprietor of Dahare chili powder.  and the main occupation of people in this town is red chilli cutting. The town was founded by Bhiwa gawali (Ref-Marathi vishwakosh). A big temple of bhima mata is in it. Bhima Mata temple is known in the nearby districts, in Vijayadashmi (Dasara) a big fear in the town all religion people celebrated together.

5 high schools are in the town. Bhiwapur Education Society high school & junior college is old high school in the town. The topper of the area are from this schools. Rashtriya vidyalaya and bhiwapur mahavidyalaya is also big high educational institute in Bhiwapur. 

The name of this town is derived from the name of goddess Bhima. A very famous temple of Bhima Devi attracts hundreds of devotees every year during the annual fair on Vijaya Dashami.

A tiny river called Maru river flows from the outskirts of Bhiwapur which dries up during hot summers and overflows during good monsoon season. This serves as a source of water for irrigation purpose for the nearby villages.

Red Chillies This town was famous for the red chillies which were grown in nearby villages. Chillies are for Bhiwapur what oranges are for Nagpur. But as the time progressed more and more farmers turned up soybean farming rather than chillies because the tedious jobs involved in chilli pepper farming and low yield as compared to the former. Comparatively low fertility of land and weather added to the worries of chilli pepper growers. So the landmark Bhiwapuri Mirchi (Chilli) is very rare to spot today. But still Bhiwapur and nearby area get large amount of chillies from all over India for processing. This involves drying up the chillies under the Sun, separating the stem from the pod, packing in gunny bags and transporting to respective destinations for further processing of consumption. This is the main source of employment for the local people who don't own land for farming.

In year 2015 the town became a Nagar Panchayat. The 17 no of ward are created in this town. Mr Lav Janbandhu is President and Mr Shanakar Dadmal is Vice President of Nagar Panchayat Bhiwapur Balaji Shankar Dewalkar, Manjusha Samarth, Kiran Nagrikar, Varsha Thakare, Archana Mothgare, Vandana Jambhulkar, Nisha Jambhule, Sita Durge, Karim Shekh, Kailash Komrelliwar, Nandu Panchabahi, Sangita Pendam, Mr. Dudhiram Janbandhu, Mr.Sandip Khadsang and Minakshi Umredkar are also a member of Nagar Panchayat.

Places to Visit

The places for visiting Bhiwapur are Bhima mata temple it is very famous temple in vidarbha every vijyadhmi big fair is located in this area, some other famous places are Shri Ganesh temple Bhiwapur hundred of devotees visit this place during every months ganesh chaturthi. Vitthal mandir kumbhar pura is also famous.

Industries

The only Noga juice factory owned by Dr. Bhivapurkar for many decades is in Bhivapur city.  Although some small and big industries have sprung up in the new industrial area, the industrial area has become important, but as such a big industry is not in the city of Bhiwapur.

Demographics  
As per Indian government census of 2011, the population was 81,519.

See also 
Byadagi chilli
 Coorg Green Cardamom

References

External links
Villages & Towns in Bhiwapur Taluka Nagpur, Maharashtra - Census 2011 

Cities and towns in Nagpur district